The 2008–09 SK Rapid Wien season is the 111th season in club history.

Squad statistics

Goal scorers

Fixtures and results

Bundesliga

League table

Cup

Champions League qualification

References

2008-09 Rapid Wien Season
Rapid Wien season